Open Letter (French: Lettre ouverte) is a 1953 French comedy film directed by Alex Joffé and starring Robert Lamoureux, Geneviève Page and Jean-Marc Thibault. The film's sets were designed by the art director Robert Clavel. Location shooting took place around Paris.

Synopsis
Martial Simonet is very jealous of his wife Colette and when he sees her writing a letter he demands to know who it is to she refuses to tell him. After she has posted it he bribes the postman to allow him to have it, but has so borrow the money from his parents in law. In cahoots with Colette, the postman has actually passed him a fake letter. It is only in the end that Martial becomes assured of his wife's fidelity.

Cast 
 Robert Lamoureux as 	Martial Simonet
 Geneviève Page as 	Colette Simonet
 Jean-Marc Thibault as 	Gaston
 Paul Bonifas as 	Honoré - le beau-père
 Rosy Varte as 	La concierge - Madame Pépin 
 Sophie Mallet as 	La bonne - Hortense
 Jacques Hilling as 	Le flic - Monsieur Pépin	
 Georges Wilson as Un locataire
 Germaine de France as 	La vieille locataire - Madame Gallot
 Claude Castaing as 	Le monsieur galant
 Solange Certain as 	Henriette
 Pierre Dux as 	Monsieur Lesage
 Mary Marquet as 	Laurence - La belle-mère
 Michel Lemoine as 	Le peintre 
 Jean Berton as 	L'inspecteur
 Geneviève Morel as 	La grosse dame 
 Paul Villé as Le chauffeur

References

Bibliography
 Bessy, Maurice & Chirat, Raymond. Histoire du cinéma français: 1951-1955. Pygmalion, 1989.
 Rège, Philippe. Encyclopedia of French Film Directors, Volume 1. Scarecrow Press, 2009.

External links 
 

1953 films
French black-and-white films
French comedy films
1953 comedy films
Films directed by Alex Joffé
1950s French-language films
Films shot in Paris
Films set in Paris
1950s French films